The Tsawout First Nation is a First Nations government located on Vancouver Island, British Columbia, Canada.  They are a member of the Sencot'en Alliance.  In the 1850s they were signatories to the Douglas Treaties. They speak the SENĆOŦEN language.

The Band's offices are located in Saanichton.

Lands

East Saanich Indian Reserve No. 2, the Tsawout First Nation main village, is about 15 minutes north of the City of Victoria and lies on the east side of the Saanich Peninsula. East Saanich IR No. 2 is approximately 241 hectares in size.

There are also Tsawout reservations on Fulford Harbour, Saturna Island, Mandarte Island, Pender Island, and Goldstream

Chief and Councillors

Treaty Process
Not participating in BC Treaty Process.

History

Demographics
The Tsawout First Nation has 766 members.

Economic Development

Social, Educational and Cultural Programs and Facilities

On July 17, 2009 the Tsawout First Nation's longhouse community centre was burned down in a mysterious fire.  Replacement for the burned structure could cost $500,000.  The structure replaced the former community centre that burned down in 1978.

See also
Douglas Treaties

References

External links
 www.tsawout.com

Coast Salish governments
Southern Vancouver Island